Invisible College is the term used for a small community of interacting scholars who often met face-to-face, exchanged ideas and encouraged each other. One group that has been described as a precursor group to the Royal Society of London consisted of a number of natural philosophers around Robert Boyle, such as Christopher Wren. It has been suggested that other members included prominent figures later closely concerned with the Royal Society; but several groups preceded the formation of the Royal Society, and who the other members of this one were is still debated by scholars.

Background
The concept of "invisible college" is mentioned in German Rosicrucian pamphlets in the early 17th century. Ben Jonson in England referenced the idea, related in meaning to Francis Bacon's House of Solomon, in a masque The Fortunate Isles and Their Union from 1624/5. The term accrued currency for the exchanges of correspondence within the Republic of Letters.

Connection with Robert Boyle and the Royal Society
Much has been made of an "invisible college" in London of the later 1640s. Revisionist history has undermined earlier narratives.

Detailed evidence
In letters in 1646 and 1647, Boyle refers to "our invisible college" or "our philosophical college". The society's common theme was to acquire knowledge through experimental investigation. Three dated letters are the basic documentary evidence: Boyle sent them to Isaac Marcombes (Boyle's former tutor and a Huguenot, who was then in Geneva), Francis Tallents who at that point was a fellow of Magdalene College, Cambridge, and London-based Samuel Hartlib.

The Hartlib Circle were a far-reaching group of correspondents linked to Hartlib, an intelligencer. They included Sir Cheney Culpeper and Benjamin Worsley who were interested, among other matters, in alchemy. Worsley in 1646 was experimenting on saltpetre manufacture, and Charles Webster in the Oxford Dictionary of National Biography argues that he was the "prime mover" of the Invisible College at this point: a network with aims and views close to those of the Hartlib Circle with which it overlapped. Margery Purver concludes that the 1647 reference of "invisible college" was to the group around Hartlib concerned to lobby Parliament in favour of an "Office of Address" or centralised communication centre for the exchange of information. Maddison suggests that the "Invisible College" might have comprised Worsley, John Dury and others with Boyle, who were interested in profiting from science (and possibly involving George Starkey).

Richard S. Westfall distinguishes Hartlib's "Comenian circle" from other groups; and gives a list of "invisible college" members based on this identification. They comprise: William Petty, Boyle, Arnold Boate and Gerard Boate, Cressy Dymock, and Gabriel Platte. Miles Symner may have belonged to this circle.

Historiography of the Royal Society

Lauren Kassell, writing for the Oxford Dictionary of National Biography, notes that the group of natural philosophers meeting in London from 1645 was identified as the "invisible college" by Thomas Birch, writing in the 18th century; this identification then became orthodox, for example in the first edition Dictionary of National Biography. This other group, later centred on Wadham College, Oxford and John Wilkins, was centrally concerned in the founding of the Royal Society; and Boyle became part of it in the 1650s. It is more properly called "the men of Gresham", from its connection with Gresham College in London.

It is the identification of the Gresham group with the "invisible college" that is now generally queried by scholars. Christopher Hill writes that the Gresham group was convened in 1645 by Theodore Haak in Samuel Foster's rooms in Gresham College; and notes Haak's membership of the Hartlib Circle and Comenian connections, while also distinguishing the two groups. Haak is mentioned as convener in an account by John Wallis, who talks about a previous group containing many physicians who then came to Foster's rooms; but Wallis's account is generally seen to be somewhat at variance with the history provided by Thomas Sprat of the Royal Society.

Modern use
The concept of invisible college was developed in the sociology of science by Diana Crane (1972) building on Derek J. de Solla Price's work on citation networks. It is related to, but significantly different from, other concepts of expert communities, such as Epistemic communities (Haas, 1992) or Community of Practice (Wenger, 1998). Recently, the concept was applied to the global network of communications among scientists by Caroline S. Wagner in The New Invisible College: Science for Development (Brookings 2008). It was also referred to in Clay Shirky's book Cognitive Surplus.

In the 1960s, a group of academics (including astronomer J. Allen Hynek and computer scientist Jacques Vallée) held regular discussion meetings about UFOs. Hynek referred to this group as The Invisible College. 

In fiction, it is mentioned in the novel The Lost Symbol by Dan Brown and Foucault's Pendulum by Umberto Eco. It was the inspiration for the Unseen University in the works of Terry Pratchett, and was one of the main reference points for Grant Morrison's The Invisibles comic book series.

See also
Junto (club)
, on underground universities

, referring to the Invisible College as an example of group collaboration
Bloomsbury Group

Notes

References
 Shirky, Clay: Cognitive Surplus: Creativity and Generosity in a Connected Age. 2011. 
 Gingrich, Owen: The Book Nobody Read: Chasing the Revolutions of Nicolaus Copernicus. Penguin Books, 2004.  Chap. 11: The Invisible College
 Bordwell, David: Making Meaning: Inference and Rhetoric in the Interpretation of Cinema. Harvard University Press, 1989, Chap. 2: Routines and Practices.
 Bordwell, David and Noël Carroll, eds. Post-Theory: Reconstructing Film Studies. University of Wisconsin Press, 1996. Chap. 1: Contemporary Film Studies and the Vicissitudes of Grand Theory.
 Crane, Diana (1972) Invisible colleges. Diffusion of knowledge in scientific communities. The University of Chicago Press: Chicago and London. 
 Wagner, Caroline S. (2008) The New Invisible College: Science for Development. Brooking Press: Washington DC. ISBN

Further reading
 Robert Lomas, The Invisible College: The Royal Society, Freemasonry and the birth of modern science, Headline Book Publishing, 2002

History of the Royal Society
Scientific organisations based in the United Kingdom
Scientific organizations established in the 17th century
Secret societies in the United Kingdom